Walcot railway station was a station in Walcot, Shropshire, England. It closed on 7 September 1964, along with the other intermediate stations on this stretch of line.
The station was demolished after closure and no trace now remains.

References

Further reading

Disused railway stations in Shropshire
Railway stations in Great Britain opened in 1849
Railway stations in Great Britain closed in 1964
Former Shrewsbury and Wellington Joint Railway stations